Corni is a commune in Galați County, Western Moldavia, Romania with a population of 2,462 people. It is composed of three villages: Corni, Măcișeni and Urlești.

References

Communes in Galați County
Localities in Western Moldavia